Daniela García may refer to:
 Daniela Garcia (politician)
 Daniela García (athlete)

See also
 Daniel García (disambiguation)